The Young Block, at 3–17 S. Main St. in Richfield, Utah, is a building built in 1907. It was listed on the National Register of Historic Places in 1980.

It was built by contractor Archibald Graham Young, a Scottish Mormon immigrant, and was deemed "the most architecturally significant commercial building in Sevier County and one of the more commercially significant buildings in Central Utah."

It is a two-story brick building on the corner of Main and Center streets, with a square corner tower rising above.

References

National Register of Historic Places in Sevier County, Utah
Buildings and structures completed in 1907
Commercial buildings on the National Register of Historic Places in Utah